Jane Wall (born 1972) is an English actress born to a Nigerian mother and an English father. She is well known for her portrayal of Constable Di Worrell in ITV's The Bill from 1999 to 2002.

Wall has also appeared in Dangerfield, A Touch of Frost, Doctors and Holby City.

In 2014, Wall appeared in LA Theatre Works' production of Racing Demon.

Filmography

References

External links

1972 births
Actresses from Lagos
Actresses from London
Black British actresses
English people of Nigerian descent
English soap opera actresses
English television actresses
Living people
Nigerian expatriates in England